Donkervoort EVx Vision is a Donkervoort full-electric concept car, designed in 2019 by Alejandro Castañeda of Mad Academy, in co-operation with One One Lab design studio. It was made as a prototype design car, but did not go in to production by Donkervoort.

References

Electric concept cars
EVx Vision